Rangpur Express is a Bangladeshi Intercity train which runs between Rangpur and Dhaka under Bangladesh Railway. The train was launched in 2011. It is one of the fastest and most luxurious trains in Bangladesh. The train does not operate on Sundays.

Train schedule 

Departure from Rangpur:   20:00 hrs            Arrival to Dhaka:     06:05 hrs

Departure from Dhaka:       09:00 hrs           Arrival to Rangpur: 19:00 hrs

Day off: Sunday

History 
On March 27, during Rangpur visit of the then Communications Minister Abul Hossain promised to start a new train between Dhaka and Rangpur. According to that announcement, Rangpur Express was launched on 21 August 2011.

Route(s) 
 Rangpur Railway Station
 Kaunia Junction
 Pirgachha 
 Bamondanga
 Noldanga
 Gaibandha
 Bonarpara
 Sonatola
 Bogura
 Santahar Junction
 Natore
 Chatmohor
 West of the Bangabandhu Bridge
 East of the Bangabandhu Bridge
 Airport Station
 Kamalapur Railway Station, Dhaka

SMS Tracking code 

Real time train location can be tracked through this SMS  TR 771 SEND to 16318.

See also
 Lalmoni Express
 Kurigram Express
 Panchagarh Express
 Drutojan Express

References

Named passenger trains of Bangladesh